Stephen Smith (born 19 September 1986) is an English former footballer who played for Cambridge United.

A midfield player, Smith graduated through the club's youth system and was given his debut by French manager Herve Renard as a 17-year-old in a match at Doncaster Rovers in April 2004. The match at Doncaster Rovers was to be Smith's final first team appearance for nearly 18 months and he failed to make an appearance as the club were relegated from the Football League in 2005.

Since Cambridge's relegation to the Nationwide Conference, Smith has become a more regular player in the team's midfield.

External links

1986 births
Living people
Sportspeople from Cambridge
English footballers
Cambridge United F.C. players
English Football League players
Association football midfielders